The Ripon Baptist Church is located in Ripon, Wisconsin. It was added to the National Register of Historic Places for its architectural significance in 2007.

References

Churches on the National Register of Historic Places in Wisconsin
Baptist churches in Wisconsin
19th-century Baptist churches in the United States
Churches in Fond du Lac County, Wisconsin
Churches completed in 1857
Ripon, Wisconsin
National Register of Historic Places in Fond du Lac County, Wisconsin
1857 establishments in Wisconsin